Symeon Seth (c. 1035 – c. 1110) was a Byzantine scientist, translator and official under Emperor Michael VII Doukas. He is often said to have been Jewish, but there is no evidence of this. He wrote four original works in Greek and translated one from Arabic.

Life
Symeon was originally from Antioch. His second name, gives as Seth or Sethi, may be a patronymic (indicating his father was named Seth) but is more probably a family name. The manuscripts of his works describe him as a philosopher and give him the titles magistros and vestes. These titles were losing their significance in Byzantium at the time; they tend to indicate an official of middling rank.

During the reign of Isaac I Komnenos, Symeon witnessed a total solar eclipse in Egypt on either 23 February 1058 or 15 February 1059. Probably he moved to Constantinople around 1071. There he sought the patronage of Michael VII and entered into literary competition with fellow polymath Michael Psellos.

According to the Alexiad (c.1148), the Emperor Alexios I Komnenos asked Symeon to translate the Arabic fable collection Kalīlah wa Dimnah into Greek. The Alexiad describes him as a mathematician and astrologer capable of predicting the future through calculations. He supposedly predicted the death of Robert Guiscard (17 July 1085). For a time he fell out of imperial favour and was imprisoned in Raidestos.

Around 1112, Symeon appears to have sold a gospel book bound between wood covers to the monastery founded by Michael Attaleiates in Constantinople. He probably died not long after. No letters written by or to Symeon survive. Nor is there evidence that he ever practiced medicine, as commonly stated.

Works
Paul Moore says "the text is really an explanation of Aetius Amidenus , with material drawn from Dioscorides . Apparently, Psellos wrote the work for the emperor Constantine IX Monomachos. It was then revised for Michael VII Doukas by Symeon Seth, who wrote a brief introduction (the proem.), made some corrections in the text, omitting some chapters. The work deals with some two hundred and twenty-eight plants and animals." The Syntagma is an important source for Byzantine cuisine and dietetics.

Simeon's work  ("On the things of nature") is a treatise on the natural sciences divided into five books. The first concerns the earth; the second, the elements; the third, the sky and the stars; the fourth, matter, form, nature and the soul (sense perception); the fifth, the final cause and divine providence. The work is heavily influenced by the philosophy of Aristotle.

He learned astronomy from Arabic sources and translated the book of fables Kalīlah wa Dimnah from Arabic to Greek in about 1080. The protagonists in the Greek version are named "Stephanites" and "Ichnelates".

Seth advanced several proofs that the earth was spherical. He noted that since the sun rises in the east before it sets in the west, it can be afternoon in Persia when it is still morning in Byzantine lands. He points out that the same eclipse that was recorded as having taken place in the afternoon by the Persians was recorded in the morning by the Greeks. Nautical and astronomical proofs are also given.

Notes

References

Further reading
 David Deakle, "Simeon Seth on Cannabis (Cognoscenti of Cannabis II)", 2001 
 Marc Émile Prosper Louis Brunet, Siméon Seth, médecin de l’empereur Michel Doucas; sa vie, son oeuvre. Première traduction en français du traité "Recueil des propriétés des aliments par ordre alphabétique", Delmas, Bordeaux, 1939.

Byzantine writers
Food writers
People from Antioch
11th-century Byzantine people
11th-century Byzantine writers
11th-century Byzantine scientists
Magistri officiorum
Translators from Arabic